Jeep Thrills is a video game for the PlayStation 2 and Wii consoles. It was developed by British studio Game Sauce and published by DSI Games. It can be played by 1 or 2 players.

Gameplay

Players will race as any of 18 different historic and modern Jeep models. They can unlock 36 different tracks. Many tracks have different secret passages (such as tunnels), and the tracks encompass a wide variety of terrain, ranging from Tundra to Jungle to Mountain oriented environments.

The game's vehicle selection consists entirely of past and present Jeep models, including various concept vehicles.

References

2008 video games
Jeep
PlayStation 2 games
Racing video games
Wii games
Destination Software games
Video games developed in the United Kingdom